Manufacturers of Soul is an album by soul music vocalist Jackie Wilson and jazz pianist and bandleader Count Basie featuring performances of jazz versions of contemporary R&B/soul hits recorded in 1968 and released on the Brunswick label.

Reception

AllMusic awarded the album 3 stars.

Track listing
 "Funky Broadway" (Lester Christian) – 2:35
 "For Your Precious Love" (Arthur Brooks, Richard Brooks, Jerry Butler) – 2:40
 "In the Midnight Hour" (Steve Cropper, Wilson Pickett) – 2:47
 "Ode to Billy Joe" (Bobbie Gentry) – 4:10
 "Chain Gang" (Sam Cooke) – 2:47
 "I Was Made to Love Her" (Stevie Wonder, Lula Mae Hardaway, Henry Cosby, Sylvia Moy) – 2:50
 "Uptight (Everything's Alright)" (Stevie Wonder, Henry Cosby, Sylvia Moy) – 2:35
 "I Never Loved a Woman (The Way I Love You)" (Ronnie Shannon) – 2:41
 "Respect" (Otis Redding) – 2:20
 "Even When You Cry" (Quincy Jones, Alan and Marilyn Bergman) – 2:42
 "My Girl" (Smokey Robinson, Ronald White) – 2:48

Personnel 
 Jackie Wilson – vocals
 Count Basie – piano
 Al Aarons, Oscar Brashear, Gene Coe, Sonny Cohn – trumpet 
 Richard Boone, Steve Galloway, Grover Mitchell – trombone
 Bill Hughes – bass trombone
 Bobby Plater, Marshal Royal – alto saxophone 
 Eric Dixon, Eddie "Lockjaw" Davis – tenor saxophone
 Charlie Fowlkes – baritone saxophone
 Freddie Green – guitar
 Uncredited – bass
 Harold Jones – drums
 Benny Carter – arranger

References 

1968 albums
Jackie Wilson albums
Count Basie Orchestra albums
Brunswick Records albums
Albums produced by Teddy Reig
Albums arranged by Benny Carter